Scopula jacta is a moth of the family Geometridae. It was described by Charles Swinhoe in 1885. It is found in Yemen and Pakistan.

References

Insects of the Arabian Peninsula
Moths of Asia
Moths described in 1885
jacta
Taxa named by Charles Swinhoe